Antonia Pilars de Pilar (1872–1946) was a court lady of the duchess of Mecklenburg-Schwerin
 Ladislaus Pilars de Pilar (1874–1952) was a Polish poet and entrepreneur
 Juan Pilars († 1521 in Cagliari) was an Italian bishop.
 Carol Pilars de Pilar (*6. August 1961), German artist

Russian nobility
Barons Pilars de Pilar